The Krida Wacana Christian University (UKRIDA or Universitas Kristen Krida Wacana) is a private university in Jakarta, Indonesia. It was founded on January 20, 1967, as Universitas Kristen Djaja. UKRIDA was founded in 1967 under the GKI Synod of West Java. UKRIDA has three campuses and two teaching hospitals, with 5 faculties and 14 study programs, of which two study programs are new study programs, namely Applied Bachelor Optometry (the first and only one in Indonesia) & Diploma (D3) Nursing . Not only that, currently UKRIDA is also developing the concentration of Biomedical Engineering in the Electrical Engineering study program. All study programs have been accredited by BAN-PT. Ukrida also equips its students with soft skills programs to be ready to enter the career world.

History

Founding and early history
On the initiative of several leaders of the West Java Indonesian Christian Church (GKI West Java Region) supported by Prof. Dr. G.A. Siwabessy (Minister of Health at the time) and Mrs. Rev. Rumambi-Kolopita (wife of the minister of information at the time), Djaya Christian University was established as a continuation of the schools under BPK Penabur (TK, SD, SMP, SMU) on January 20, 1967, with the Decree of the Director General of Higher Education Depdikbud RI No. 202/DPT/I/1970.

Due to the necessity to separate the management of basic, secondary, and general education from higher education, since November 22, 1990, the management of Ukrida was separated from BPK Penabur to the Christian Higher Education Foundation (YPTK) Krida Wacana.

To synchronize with the PTK Krida Wacana Foundation, the name of Djaya Christian University was officially changed on February 8, 1992, to Krida Wacana Christian University in accordance with the Decree of the Minister of Education and Culture of the Republic of Indonesia No. 0106/0/1992, while still using the acronym UKRIDA.

Teaching and learning activities since 1985 until now are at Campus I Tanjung Duren; previously held at Gunung Sahari Campus, Jl. Gunung Sahari 90A, Central Jakarta. UKRIDA continues to develop its campus by establishing Campus II UKRIDA at Jalan Canal Arjuna No. 6. Campus II has been used since August 2002, especially for the Faculty of Medicine and Health Sciences UKRIDA. The next development is Campus III at Wilcon Sentra Bisnis Blok A 6A/11, specifically for the Faculty of Economics and Business as well as the UKRIDA Course and Training Institute.

Accreditation
Excellent Institutional Accreditation from BAN-PT

Faculty

Diploma 3 
Faculty of Medicine and Health Science 
Nursing

Applied Bachelor 
Faculty of Medicine and Health Science 
Optometry

Bachelor 
Faculty of Medicine and Health Science 
Medical Science 

Faculty of Economics and Business 
Management (Specialties: Digital Business, Fintech) 
Accounting (Specialties: Tax for Digital Business, Contemporary Audit) 

 Faculty of Engineering and Computer Science 
Electric Engineering (Specialties: Intelligent Systems & Robotics, Biomedical Engineering) 
Civil Engineering (Specialties: Infrastructure Design, Infrastructure Management) 
Industrial Engineering (Specialties: Digital Supply Chain Management, Digital Product Design) 
Informatics (Specialties: Intelligent Systems, Health Informatics) 
Information System (Specialties: Full Stack Development, Business Intelligence & Data Science) 

 Faculty of Psychology 
Psychology 

 Faculty of Social Science and Humanities 
English Literature (Specialties: Creative Writing, Translation and Interpreting, Teaching English to Speakers of Other Languages)

Profession 
Faculty of Medicine and Health Science 
Medical Doctor

Post-graduate schools 
Faculty of Economics and Business 
Magister Management (Specialties: Marketing Management, Financial Management, Human Resources Management, School Management, Church Management, Hospital Management)

Program

Regular Program
Regular programs at UKRIDA include Diploma, Bachelor, Professional, and Master programs

Employee Class Program (Blended Learning)
Employee class lecture program (blended learning) weekdays and weekends at UKRIDA is available for the Faculty of Economics and Business

Past Learning Recognition Program (RPL)
The past learning recognition program (RPL) at UKRIDA is available for Electrical Engineering, Civil Engineering, Industrial Engineering, Informatics, Information Systems, Management, Accounting, and Optometry study programs. There are 2 types of UKRIDA RPL programs to choose from:
Type A1: never studied at university (for RPL Type A1)
Type A2: have work experience in the field of work that is in accordance with the study program to be taken

Fast-Track Program
The Fast-Track program at the UKRIDA Faculty of Engineering and Computer Science is a collaborative program with Mingchi University of Science and Technology, Taiwan, where students can obtain Bachelor and master's degrees within 5 years (3 years of Bachelor program at UKRIDA and 2 years of Master program at Mingchi University of Science and Technology). The Ukrida Fast-Track program is available for Electrical Engineering, Civil Engineering, Industrial Engineering, Informatics, and Information Systems study programs
In addition, there is also a choice of fast-track programs (S1 + S2) for the UKRIDA Faculty of Economics and Business

Alumni

- Julita, Procurement Senior Manager Danone Indonesia

- Pui Sudarto, Founder & President Director Pulau Intan

- Hartono, Assistant Professor Singapore Institute of Technology

- Ang Tjin Siong, Chief Executive Officer (CEO) PT GEMAbangun PROnaperkasa

- Yohanes Kurnia, Founder & Chief Executive Officer (CEO) PT SARI Teknologi

- dr. Joe, Content Creator TikTok

- Tengku Nadira, Artis

- Royanto Handaya, President Director Panorama Tours (PT Panorama JTB Tours Indonesia)

- Vamiga Michel, Former Professional Basketball Player for Satria Muda Pertamina, Jakarta (Oct 2009- Oct 2019)

- Avan Seputra, Professional Basketball Player for Satria Muda Pertamina, Jakarta

- Gunawan Professional, Basketball Player for Amatha Hangtuah, Jakarta

- Dharmaputra Adiwidya, GM Finance & Administration PT Rajawali Citra Televisi Indonesia

- Andrey Setiawan, General Practitioner Mayapada Hospital

- Jimmy Setiawan, Software Engineer Insignia Venture Partners (Singapore Company)

- Ferry Chandra, Software Engineer Tokopedia

- Liem Kwok Cek, Senior Product Marketing Manager Samsung Electronics

- Robbyanto, Principal Tunas Bangsa Christian School

- Adriani Gunawan, Director of Administration & Student Affairs Conservatory of Music, UPH (Universitas Pelita Harapan)

- Jefferson Setiawan, Principal Engineer-iOS, Tokopedia

- Erik Kurniadi Harijanto, AVP, System Architect First Foundation Inc, USA

- Antony Japari, CEO PT. Capital Life Indonesia

- Tjipto Santoso, Direksi Bank Index

- Daniel Pattinama, Recruitment Alodokter

- Fredy Lie, Head of Engineering, Tokopedia

References

External links 
 

Association of Christian Universities and Colleges in Asia
Educational institutions established in 1967
Universities in Jakarta
Private universities and colleges in Jakarta